Promi Big Brother is a spin-off of the German reality television series Big Brother, broadcast in Germany. It is airing on Sat.1, it involves a group of celebrities, called housemates, living in isolation from the outside world in a custom-built "house". The actions of the participants are recorded constantly by microphones and cameras situated in each room. Regularly, the housemates nominate one or two other members of the group each to face eviction; those with the most nominations face a public telephone vote, and the housemate who receives the most public votes is evicted. This procedure continues until the final day, when the viewers vote for who of the remaining participants they want to win the programme.

Since the start of Promi Big Brother in 2013 there have been a total of 105 housemates. There have been 8 winners of Promi Big Brother; five men and three women. The youngest winner is Aaron Troschke who was 24 at the time of winning Promi Big Brother 2, and the oldest is Werner Hansch, who was 82 when he won Promi Big Brother 8. The youngest housemates was Alessia-Millane Herren from Promi Big Brother 8, who entered the house at age 18. The oldest housemate was Werner Hansch from Promi Big Brother 8, who entered the house at age 81.

Housemates

 Winner
 Runner-up
 Third place
 Walked
 Ejected
 Participating
 Housemate entered for the second time

Notes
 Ages at the time the housemate entered the house

Guests
On some occasions, celebrities have entered the house for a short period of time as guests.

References

External links
 Official website

Promi Big Brother